Brenda Chapman (born 1955) is a Canadian writer of mystery novels. Her Jennifer Bannon mysteries are for ages ten and up. She has also published several short stories and murder mysteries. Her Stonechild and Rouleau Mystery Series feature the damaged, brilliant detective Kala Stonechild and workaholic staff sergeant Jacques Rouleau.

Bio
Chapman grew up in Terrace Bay, Ontario, a small town on the North Shore of Lake Superior. She graduated from Lakehead University, majoring in English literature, and earned a Bachelor of Education degree from Queen's University. After teaching special education for fifteen years, she became a senior communications advisor in the federal government. Chapman served two terms as President of Capital Crime Writers. She lives in Ottawa, Ontario.

Published works

Novels
Running Scared. Napoleon Publishing, 2004.  YA
Hiding in Hawk's Creek. Napoleon Publishing 2006 YA
Where Trouble Leads. Napoleon Publishing 2007 YA
Trail of Secrets. Napoleon Publishing 2009 YA
In Winter's Grip. Rendezvous Crime Press 2010 Adult

Stonechild and Rouleau Mystery Series 
Cold Mourning. Dundurn Press 2014 Adult
Butterfly Kills. Dundurn Press 2015 Adult
Tumbled Graves. Dundurn Press 2016 Adult
Shallow End. Dundurn Press 2017 Adult
Bleeding Darkness. Dundurn Press 2018 Adult
Turning Secrets. Dundurn Press 2019 Adult
Closing Time. Dundurn Press 2020 Adult

Short stories and articles
True North. Canadian Living, August 2001
Thicker Than Water.  StoryTeller Magazine,(Spring 2008) and Papercuts (Spring 2008)
My Sister Caroline. When Boomers Go Bad, (Rendezvous Crime 2005)
the second wife. (Rapid reads 2011)

Awards

2008 Audrey Jessup Award for Best Short Story for Evening The ScoreHiding in Hawk's Creek selected by the Canadian Book Centre as an Our Choice novel for 2006.Hiding in Hawk's Creek was also a finalist for the Canadian Library Association Book of the Year for Children Award.

References

Sources
Brenda Chapman on CBC Canada All in a Day Literary Salon
 "Brenda Chapman". CANSCAIP Members''. Canadian Society of Children's Authors, Illustrators, and Performers (canscaip.org). Archived 2010-01-17. Retrieved 2015-07-30.
Canadian Teacher Magazine Review of Running Scared
The Canadian Children's Book Centre - Directory of Authors
The Canadian Children's Book Centre (CCBC) Canadian books recommended for young readers; listing for Brenda Chapman.
Ottawa Public Library Foundation:  Brenda Chapman Profile
Ottawa Focus, Online Guide to the Capital: Ottawa Authors

External links
 
 

1955 births
Living people
Canadian mystery writers
21st-century Canadian novelists
Canadian writers of young adult literature
People from Thunder Bay District
Writers from Ottawa
Queen's University at Kingston alumni
Lakehead University alumni
Canadian women novelists
Women mystery writers
Canadian women short story writers
21st-century Canadian women writers
Women writers of young adult literature
21st-century Canadian short story writers